The discography of Del the Funky Homosapien consists of eleven studio albums and one compilation album.

Albums

Studio albums

Compilations

Collaborations

Singles

Appearances

References

Hip hop discographies
Discographies of American artists